The Journal of Allergy and Clinical Immunology is a monthly peer-reviewed medical journal covering research on allergy and immunology. It is one of two official journals of the American Academy of Allergy, Asthma, and Immunology. The journal was established in 1929 as the Journal of Allergy and obtained its current name in 1971. The name change was purportedly related to a change in the attitude among physicians about the breadth of applicability of the term "allergy". The journal has been published under the Mosby imprint since its inception.

According to the Journal Citation Reports, the journal has a 2021 impact factor of 14.29, ranking it second out of 25 in the category "Allergy".
</ref>

The editor-in-chief is Zuhair K. Ballas, who succeeded Donald Y.M. Leung (1997–2015) in 2016.

References

External links

Mosby academic journals
Immunology journals
Monthly journals
Publications established in 1929
English-language journals
Academic journals associated with learned and professional societies